Gonzalo Germán Galindo Sánchez (born October 20, 1974) is a Bolivian retired football midfielder.

Club career
At the club level, he has played for Jorge Wilstermann (twice), Bolivar, the Ecuatorian club Emelec, Alianza Lima of Peru, and The Strongest.

International career
Galindo made his debut for the Bolivia national team in 1999, and has been capped 43 times and scored 3 goals. He represented his country in 20 FIFA World Cup qualification matches and at the 1999 Confederations Cup.

References

External links
 
  

1974 births
Living people
Sportspeople from Cochabamba
Association football midfielders
Bolivian footballers
Bolivia international footballers
C.D. Jorge Wilstermann players
Club Bolívar players
C.S. Emelec footballers
Club Alianza Lima footballers
The Strongest players
Club Real Potosí players
Club Aurora players
1999 FIFA Confederations Cup players
2001 Copa América players
2004 Copa América players
2007 Copa América players
Bolivian expatriate footballers
Expatriate footballers in Ecuador
Expatriate footballers in Peru